George William Orme (September 16, 1891 – March 16, 1962) was a backup outfielder in Major League Baseball who played briefly for the Boston Red Sox during the  season. Listed at 5' 10", 160 lb., Orme batted and threw right-handed. He was born in Lebanon, Indiana.
 
In a four-game career, Orme was a .333 hitter (2-for-6) with four runs, one RBI, and a .556 on-base percentage without home runs.

Orme died at the age of 70 in Indianapolis, Indiana.

See also
1920 Boston Red Sox season

External links

1891 births
1962 deaths
Boston Red Sox players
Major League Baseball outfielders
Baseball players from Indiana
People from Lebanon, Indiana
Champaign Velvets players
Streator Boosters players